Kashid is a beach village in Murud taluka on the shores of the Arabian Sea, in the North Konkan region of Maharashtra, India.  It is located 15 km from Murud City and 135 km from Mumbai on the Alibag-Murud road. The beach is wedged between two rocky hills in a semi circular arch and is possibly the finest stretch of the sea in North Konkan between Mandwa and Murud-Janjira.Now water sports activities are also available on the beach during peak hours. Hotels and homestays are available all along the State highway which runs close to the beach. However other than one or two of the luxury hotels, the others can be below par especially after the Covid induced lockdown that killed the travel and industry for close to two years . There are some places to visit and in around Kashid like the Phansad Bird sanctuary, the Korlai fort and the Datta Mandir at Revdanda. A Ro-Ro ferry service started about two years ago, allows one to drive down to Kashid on a ship from Ferry Wharf to Mandwa and then by road from there on.However prior reservations are a must especially on week-ends

External links
 

Villages in Raigad district
Konkan